Willard Louis (April 19, 1882 – July 22, 1926) was an American stage and film actor of the silent era. He appeared in more than 80 films between 1911 and 1926. He was born in San Francisco, California.

Louis had an art studio before he became an actor at age 20. He acted on stage for four years before he began making films. In addition to his work in dramatic films, Louis performed in comedic roles. In 1926, he signed a five-year contract with Warner Bros., with some of the proposed films having him co-starring with Louise Fazenda.

Lous died of typhoid fever and pneumonia in Glendale, California, aged 44.

Partial filmography

 A Man of Sorrow (1916)
 The Man from Bitter Roots (1916)
 The Battle of Hearts (1916)
 The Fires of Conscience (1916)
 The Island of Desire (1917)
 The Book Agent (1917)
 A Tale of Two Cities (1917)
 Madame Du Barry (1917)
 A Branded Soul (1917)
 One Touch of Sin (1917)
 The Unpainted Woman (1919)
 Love Insurance (1919)
 The Loves of Letty (1919)
 The Scarlet Shadow (1919)
 What Am I Bid? (1919)
 Going Some (1920)
 The Great Accident (1920)
 Dollars and Sense (1920)
 Madame X (1920)
 A Slave of Vanity (1920)
 Moonlight and Honeysuckle (1921)
 Robin Hood (1922)
 Only a Shop Girl (1922)
 Vanity Fair (1923)
 McGuire of the Mounted (1923)
 The French Doll (1923)
 The Marriage Market (1923)
 Her Marriage Vow (1924)
 A Lady of Quality (1924)
 Daddies (1924)
 Three Women (1924)
 Babbitt (1924)
 Beau Brummel (1924)
 The Lover of Camille (1924)
 Don't Doubt Your Husband (1924)
 A Broadway Butterfly (1925)
 Eve's Lover (1925)
 The Man Without a Conscience (1925)
 Kiss Me Again (1925)
 Hogan's Alley (1925)
 Three Weeks in Paris (1925)
 His Secretary (1925)
 The Love Toy (1926)
 Madamoiselle Modiste (1926)
 The Shamrock Handicap (1926)
 Don Juan (1926)
 The Honeymoon Express (1926)
 A Certain Young Man (1927) (*uncredited; posthumous performance)

References

External links

1882 births
1926 deaths
Deaths from typhoid fever
American male film actors
American male silent film actors
Deaths from pneumonia in California
Infectious disease deaths in California
Male actors from San Francisco
20th-century American male actors